Cooperative Bank of Oromia is a private commercial bank in Ethiopia. The Coopbank now has a total asset value of more than ETB 121 billion. The bank has 610+ branch networks, 10 million account holders, and more than 11,500 employees. The bank's headquarters is located in Addis Ababa, Africa Avenue Flamingo area. The bank has a broad ownership base and diversified ownership structure.

History
The history of cooperative banks has been traced back to the financial exclusion faced by many communities in the 19th century. With the industrial revolution, the emerging financial services sector was primarily focused on wealthy individuals and large enterprises in urban areas. The rural population, particularly farmers, small businesses, and the communities they supported, were excluded from financial services. Thus, cooperative banks were originally set up to correct this market failure and to overcome the associated problems of asymmetric information in favor of borrowers.

In respect of Ethiopia, the country has a very low financial service coverage as mainstream financial institutions are heavily tilted towards the urban centers with good physical infrastructure, leaving the rural areas underserved. Traditionally, ‘Equbs’ and ‘Idirs’ are informal institutions that are deeply ingrained in the life of communities and have also been serving financial needs of the rural society to some extent. Reluctance and low capacity of the formal financial institutions in the country to serve rural community, a demand-supply gap prevailed in financial market especially in rural areas, coupled with farmers’ awareness to be organized into cooperatives and the increasing need to finance cooperatives called for establishment of a cooperative bank. Furthermore, finance appeared to be the critical bottleneck to sustain the cooperative institutions and ultimately the farmers. It was all these glitches that initiated the inception and establishment of Cooperative Bank of Oromia.

Haile Gebre Lube, regarded as the founding father (proponent) of Ethiopia’s cooperatives, brought the idea of founding the bank for he believed that the best way to fight poverty is through cooperation. Formally establishing a project office in 2002, the bank’s formation was realized with majority of shareholders being the cooperative societies. The bank then is commercially licensed in October 2004 and commenced operations in March 2005. As there is no legal provisions that allow establishment of a cooperative bank in the country, the bank was registered in accordance with article 304 of the commercial code of Ethiopia.

The Bank has broad ownership base and diversified ownership structure. It comprises Cooperatives and Non-Cooperative members. Cooperative member includes Primary Cooperatives, Cooperative Unions and Cooperatives Federation whereas, non-Cooperative members includes Organizations, Associations and individuals.

The Coopbank now has a total asset value of more than ETB 121 billion. The bank has 610+ branch networks, 10 million account holders, and more than 11,500 employees.

Vision 
To be the leading private bank in Ethiopia by 2025.

Mission 
We root our foundation in communities to provide banking solutions that create greater customer experience with emphasis to cooperatives and agro-based businesses through proper use of human resource and up-to-date technologies to maximize stakeholders’ value.

Core Values 
The following set of values will serve to guide the words and actions of all our employees;

 Integrity
 Customer Satisfaction
 Learning Organization
 Teamwork
 Cost Consciousness
 Concern for Community

References

External links
 Official website

Cooperative banking
Banks of Ethiopia
Banks established in 2005
Companies based in Addis Ababa